Malešići may refer to:

 Malešići (Gračanica), a village in the municipality of Gračanica, Bosnia and Herzegovina
 Malešići (Ilijaš), a village in the municipality of Ilijaš, Bosnia and Herzegovina